River Park is an outdoor shopping center in Fresno, California on the east side of Blackstone Avenue. River Park is divided into three areas: The Marketplace, a traditional power center anchored by Target and Kohl's; an auxiliary shopping center with Chick-fil-A, Chipotle Mexican Grill and In-N-Out Burger, and The Shops at River Park, an outdoor lifestyle center anchored by Macy's, an Edwards Theatres cinema, and REI.

History
River Park opened in several phases starting in 1996. Target and Best Buy anchored the initial phase of the project, which also included Old Navy, Marshalls, OfficeMax, Sports Authority, a JCPenney Home Store, CompUSA, and Linens 'n Things. Kohl's opened in 2004, followed by an expansion of the shopping center's lifestyle center The Shops at River Park in 2005. This added Gottschalks and REI as additional anchors, along with the existing Home Fabrics (which had replaced Zany Brainy), Borders, and Edwards Cinemas. The bankruptcies and subsequent liquidations of CompUSA, Gottschalks, Borders, Linens 'n Things, and Sports Authority left several large boxes in the center, which were filled with an Ashley Furniture (formerly CompUSA), Macy's (formerly Gottschalks), an H&M (formerly Borders), a Buy Buy Baby (formerly Linens 'n Things), and a Dick's Sporting Goods (formerly Sports Authority) respectively.

JCPenney Home Store closed in August 2017, with a smaller selection of home products being added at the JCPenney department store at nearby Fashion Fair Mall. The space is now replaced by Bob's Discount Furniture.

Romano's Macaroni Grill, an original restaurant to The Marketplace opening in 1998, permanently closed in April 2020 and was demolished the next year. In August 2022, Nike signed a lease to open a new 14,000 square foot retail store on the site of the former restaurant, however construction has not yet begun.   

Regal Cinemas fully remodeled the 22 screen Edwards Cinema during the COVID-19 closure period, which had remained unchanged since its opening in 1996. Edwards Cinemas Fresno 22 was rebranded and reopened as a 19 screen Regal Cinemas. The standalone IMAX theater elsewhere in the center was permanently closed, and a new IMAX auditorium was constructed within the main theater. It is unknown what will replace the IMAX theater at this time. 

In late 2021, Brooks Burgers, opened in River Park where The Hangar shut down.

Anchors and major stores
Target - 
Macy's - , opened 2010 in former Gottschalks
Regal Cinemas - , formerly Edwards Cinemas
Kohl's - 
Bob's Discount Furniture - , formerly JCPenney Home Store (1996-2017)
Dick's Sporting Goods - , opened 2017 in former Sports Authority
Best Buy - 
OfficeMax - 
Marshall's - 
REI - 
H&M - , opened 2014 in former Borders
Buy Buy Baby - , opened 2011 in former Linens 'n Things
Yard House - , opened 2014 in former Zany Brainy
Ashley Furniture - , opened 2010 in former CompUSA

See also
Fashion Fair Mall

References

External links
 River Park

Buildings and structures in Fresno, California
Shopping malls in Fresno County, California
Tourist attractions in Fresno, California
Shopping malls established in 1997